Patricia Falco Beccalli (born 21 January 1970 in Vienna, Austria) is a freelance moderator, executive media coach and writer. For over 14 years she was a financial journalist and anchor of CNBC TV based in London. Moving on to Germany, she reported daily from the Frankfurt stock exchange on business and financial markets for many international studios of the CNBC network. She also reported for the German television station N24. Prior to CNBC she worked for the Italian broadcaster RAI 3 in Rome.

Biography 
After studying Economics and Communications Patricia Falco Beccalli worked as a broker, private banker and portfolio manager in Frankfurt, London and Luxembourg and was a registered stockbroker at the London Stock Exchange. She speaks five languages, German, English, French, Italian and Slovak. She has a daughter born in 2005.

From 1989 to 1999 she headed the stock exchange news department at the Italian public service broadcaster RAI. In 1999 she joined CNBC in London, where she became the co-anchor of the business news programmes Morning Exchange and Power Lunch Europe. She was the main contributor to CNBC's Capital Connection, Worldwide Exchange and Squawk Box Europe. She also was chief reporter for the automotive industry.

Patricia Falco Beccalli also moderates international political summits, economic and corporate conferences, such as the World Economic Forum (WEF) in Davos, Digital Life Design (DLD) in Munich, Northern Light in Helsinki, Euro Finance Week in Frankfurt.

Patricia Falco Beccalli is a world renowned venture capitalist

Books 
 Ricca Germania poveri tedeschi. Il lato oscuro del benessere (Università Bocconi, March  2014, in Italian)

External links 
 Biography on management site

Sources

References 

Living people
1970 births
Women television journalists
Business and financial journalists
Austrian financial analysts
Women financial analysts
Stockbrokers
Journalists from Vienna
CNBC Europe
Women stockbrokers
Women business and financial journalists